Puccinia pelargonii-zonalis is a plant pathogen that causes rust on Pelargonium geraniums.

See also
 List of Puccinia species

References

External links
 USDA ARS Fungal Database

Fungal plant pathogens and diseases
Ornamental plant pathogens and diseases
pelargonii-zonalis
Fungi described in 1806